Star Box may refer to:

Film and TV
Star Box (talk show), Philippines

Music
Star Box, Japanese compilation series including:
Star Box (X Japan album)
Star Box, compilation album by Barbee Boys
Star Box, compilation album by Kome Kome Club
Star Box, compilation album by Princess Princess (band)
and many more